Sławociesze is a part of the Szczecin City, Poland situated on the right bank of Oder river, east of the Szczecin Old Town, and Szczecin-Dąbie.

Before 1945 when Stettin was a part of Germany, the German name of this suburb was Stettin-Franzhausen.

Neighbourhoods of Szczecin